Changchun Christian Church is one of the largest and historically important Protestant churches in Changchun, Jilin Province, China.

General 

Changchun Christian Church is one of the largest and historically important Protestant churches in Changchun, Jilin Province, China.  Also housed here are the Three-Self Patriotic Movement Committees of Changchun City and Jilin Province.

The church's address is: No. 131, West Wuma Road, Nanguan District, Changchun City, 134402. It is also called the Xiwu Road church.  Worship is held at 8:00 Sunday, 16:00 Wednesday, 16:00 Friday and 9:00 Saturday.

Brief history 

 In 1886, the Irish Presbyterian Mission (Thomas Crosby Fulton, in ) was sent to Changchun.　　
 In 1893, joined by the English Presbyterian Mission (English name uncertain, in ), which four years later built a church at the present site.
 In 1902, a medical hospital was built next to the church, which remains as Changchun Women's Hospital.
 In 1930, the church's annex building was built.
 In 1941, as the British-Japanese relations soured, the church was ceded to the Japanese and it became the Manchurian United Christian Church headquarters.
 After 1959, the church participates in the Three-Self Patriotic Movement and belongs to the China Christian Council.
 In 1998, the 3-storey present church building was built in an Irish Protestant church style.  It can accommodate 6,000 people.

See also 
 Presbyterian Church
 Manchukuo
 Three-Self Patriotic Movement
 China Christian Council
 Protestant churches in Northeast China:
Dalian Yuguang Street Church, Shenyang Dongguan Church, Changchun Christian Church, Harbin Nangang Christian Church, etc.

References

External links 
 Changchun Women's Hospital (in Chinese)

Churches in Changchun